Bradford G. Stroh is an entrepreneur, who has founded and led several companies, and also an author.  Stroh co-founded Freedom Financial Network and several related specialty finance businesses.  He is currently the CEO of Bills.com.

Education
Stroh received his MBA from Stanford Business School, where he was an Arjay Miller Scholar, and received a BA from Amherst College, where he captained the men's Lacrosse team.

Career
Prior to founding Bills.com and Freedom Financial Network, Stroh was an investor in financial services and growth companies at TA Associates, a private equity fund, CIVC Partners, an investment fund, and Doll Capital Management, a venture capital firm. Stroh has also worked with two start-ups: Trigo Technologies (sold to IBM) and Luminous Networks, a Gigabit Ethernet startup. He is an investor, board adviser and board member to several entrepreneurial companies, including Ujogo, BioIQ, Goldline International, Position2, SharesPost, Stream Dynamics, Realty Nation, Vertical Brands, Group Card, Home-Account and Vitality Health (sold to CarePayments Technology,).

In 2002, Stroh and his business partner Andrew Housser founded Freedom Financial Network (FFN), to provide a full range of specialty financial services to U.S. consumers. Companies within the Freedom Network are Freedom Debt Relief, offering debt relief assistance; Freedom Tax Relief to manage IRS tax debts; Golden Road Financial focused on mortgage lending; and the most recent acquisition in early 2010, Home Account.  Stroh is currently the Founder and CEO of Bills.com which provides tools and information to help consumers make better personal financial decisions.  Entrepreneur magazine named Bills.com No. 3 in the Hot 100, of fastest growing companies in America. Bills.com has been named to the Inc. 500/5000 in 2008, 2009, and 2010. The company employs approximately 600 people, and has annual revenue of $106 million.

Stroh also wrote the fictional novel The Dharma King about Tibetan Buddhism and the search for the Panchen Lama.

Awards
 2008 Winner of the Ernst & Young Entrepreneurs of the Year for the Northern California region
Named to the Silicon Valley/San Jose Business Journal's "40 Under 40" list

Personal life

Brad is of German descent. Brad is married to Brandy Stroh and have 2 kids Brooke and Brayden. They currently live in Portola Valley, California.

References

External links

Profiles

 Brad Stroh Website

Talks
 Early Stage Sales – Stanford Business School
 Starting a Business After School – Stanford Business School
 Stroh at The Commonwealth Club
 Interview on CNN
 Interview on KRON4 TV
 Interview on NBC News
 Bradford Stroh on Fox

American financial businesspeople
Silicon Valley people
Stanford University alumni
Stanford Graduate School of Business alumni
People from the San Francisco Bay Area
1973 births
Living people